Qurnat as Sawdā, is the highest point in Lebanon and the Levant, at 3,088 meters above sea level. It is found at the peak of Jabal al Makmel, a mountain range in the Bsharri District, North Lebanon.

Name
The mountain's name derives from the Classical Syriac  (Qornet Sohde), for "Martyrs' Mountain". This, in turn, refers to late-13th century campaigns in the region by the Muslim Mamluk Sultanate during its conquest of the Christian Crusader states. Its name, like many other local toponyms, was retained even after the decline of Syriac as a vernacular tongue in the region.

Topography
Qurnat as Sawda is part of the Lebanon Mountains range and is a limestone and dolomite massif. The mountain has several peaks, with the highest one being the summit.

Climate
The climate of Qurnat as Sawda is typically alpine, with cold and snowy winters and mild summers. The area receives significant precipitation, especially during the winter months.

Biodiversity
The mountain is home to several unique plant and animal species, some of which are endemic to the region. It is also an important site for birdwatching, with several species of raptors, such as the golden eagle, spotted in the area.

Hiking and tourism
Qurnat as Sawda is a popular destination for hikers and mountaineers, with several hiking trails leading to the summit. The area also attracts tourists who come to admire the stunning views of the surrounding landscape, including the Mediterranean Sea and the Bekaa Valley. There are also several villages and towns in the vicinity, such as Bsharri, which offer accommodations and services for visitors.

References in medieval religious literature
In Jacobus de Voragine's Golden Legend, the summit of Mount Lebanon (Qurnat as Sawda') is the site on which Noah, after having survived the flood, replanted a sacred tree. Voragine states that the tree's seeds were given to Seth by an angel in the Garden of Eden and placed in Adam's mouth upon his passing such that his blood could feed its growth.

References 

Mountains of Lebanon
Highest points of countries